Robert Brian McCaslin (born November 21, 1957) is an American politician and educator from Washington. McCaslin was a Republican member of the Washington House of Representatives, representing the 4th Legislative District from November 25, 2014, until January 9, 2023.

Early life and education 
McCaslin is the son of Bob McCaslin Sr., who served as a member of the Washington State Senate from 1981 to 2011 and Spokane City Council. McCaslin earned a Bachelor of Arts from Washington State University and Master of Education from Whitworth University.

Career 
McCaslin works as a kindergarten teacher.

McCaslin was sworn in early due to the resignation of Larry Crouse. He is from Spokane Valley. McCaslin sought to be appointed to Crouse's seat in January 2014, but Leonard Christian was chosen instead by Spokane County commissioners.

On November 4, 2014, McCaslin won the election and became a Republican member of Washington House of Representatives for District 4, Position1. McCaslin defeated Diana Wilhite with 58.0% of the votes.

In multiple legislative sessions, McCaslin has proposed bills calling for the creation of a new state called "Liberty" carved out of Eastern Washington.

In August 2021, McCaslin and four other state Republican lawmakers held an unofficial hearing with the aim of possibly calling for a "forensic audit" to take place in Washington State similar to the controversial Arizona audit. The group that organized the event also invited figures that have falsely claimed there was voter fraud in the 2020 presidential election.

References

External links 
 Bob McCaslin Jr. at ballotpedia.org

Living people
People from Spokane Valley, Washington
American educators
Republican Party members of the Washington House of Representatives
1957 births
21st-century American politicians